The following is a list of notable Argentine Americans, including both original immigrants who obtained American citizenship.

List

Actors and actresses 
 Alejandro Agresti - film director and producer
 Carlos Alazraqui - actor, comedian, impressionist and voice actor
 Stephanie Beatriz - actress
 Alexis Bledel - actress
 Linda Cristal - actress
 Juan Diego Botto - actor
 India Eisley - actress
 Julie Gonzalo - actress; Argentine born, American raised
 Olivia Hussey - Argentine-British actress
 Fernando Lamas - actor and director
 Lorenzo Lamas - actor
 Shayne Lamas - actress
 Florencia Lozano - actress
 Mía Maestro - actress
 Miguel Mas - actor, writer, director
 Eduardo Montes-Bradley - American writer-filmmaker
 Camila Morrone - actress, model
 Jacqueline Obradors - American actress
 Juan Pablo Di Pace - Actor
 J. D. Pardo - American actor of Argentine and Salvadoran descent
 Carlos Olguin-Trelawny - film director, screenwriter and digital artist
 Alejandro Rey - actor
 Sol Rodriguez - actress
 Ignacio Serricchio - actor
 Adrián Suar - Argentine Jewish former actor
 Anya Taylor-Joy - actress, model
 Carmen Zapata - American actress

Journalists 
 Candela Ferro - journalist, model
 Uki Goñi - journalist, author and historian
 Enrique Gratas - journalist
 Pablo Kleinman - journalist and entrepreneur
 Andrés Oppenheimer - journalist
 David Pakman - journalist
 Daniel Viotto - former news presenter of CNN en Español

Models 
 Yamila Diaz-Rahi - model
 Luján Fernández - model
 Marianela Pereyra - model, actress, television personality
 Inés Rivero - model

Musicians 
 Mildred Couper - American composer and pianist
 Jorge Dalto - jazz pianist, born in Argentina
 Diego García - lead singer of the band Elefant and solo artist
 Albert Hammond, Jr. - guitarist for New York rock band The Strokes
 Kevin Johansen - singer, half Argentine 
 Julio "Jimmy" Ledezma - Argentine-born American musician
 Ana Lenchantin - cellist
 Paz Lenchantin - musician
 Miguel Mateos - Argentine singer
 Raul Midon - singer-songwriter and guitarist from New Mexico
 Astor Piazzolla - tango composer
 Silvia Roederer - musician
 Lalo Schifrin - pianist and composer; composed theme for the Mission: Impossible television series
 Bebu Silvetti - Argentine pianist, composer
 Terig Tucci - composer, violinist, pianist, and mandolinist
 Ezequiel Viñao - composer
 Dick Haymes - singer and actor

Science and mathematics 
 Fernando Caldeiro - astronaut
 Gregory Chaitin - mathematician and theoretical computer scientist
 Graciela Chichilnisky - mathematical economist and an expert on climate change
 Gustavo Scuseria - physics and mathematics
 Irene M. Gamba - mathematician
 Andrew Huberman - neuroscientist
 William Henry Hudson - Argentine-British author, naturalist and ornithologist
 Veronica Prego - medical doctor
 David D. Sabatini - cell biologist
 Eduardo D. Sontag - mathematics
 Carlos Sueldo - physician, professor of medicine

Sport 
 Marcelo Balboa - American former soccer defender
 Max Battimo - American hockey referee
 Ernie Buriano - retired Argentine-American footballer
 Tranquilo Cappozzo - rower
 Efrain Chacurian - retired Argentine-American soccer forward
 Renato Corsi - retired American-Argentine footballer
 Juan DeBiedma - professional Super Smash Bros. Melee player
 Angelo DiBernardo - retired Argentine-American soccer player
 Paul DiBernardo - retired Argentine-American soccer midfielder who coaches youth soccer
 Héctor Echavarría - kickboxer
 Bryan Gerzicich - soccer player
 Bill Gramática - American football placekicker
 Sebastian Lletget - soccer player
 Martin Gramatica - American football placekicker
 Juan Kachmanian - professional wrestler
 Pablo Mastroeni - soccer player
 Claudio Reyna - soccer player, half Argentine
 Giovanni Reyna - soccer player

Visual artists 
 Sebastian Spreng - visual artist

Others 
 Luis Alberto Ambroggio - poet, scholar, and writer
 Lisa Cano Burkhead - lieutenant governor of Nevada
 Andrés Cantor - sportscaster
 Gonzalo Casals - New York City Commissioner of Cultural Affairs
 Billy Dalto - politician
 Ariel Dorfman - author
 Gerardo L. Munck - professor, academic
 Fabian Nicieza - writer and editor
 Alejandro Orfila - Argentine career diplomat
 Luis Palau - Christian evangelist
 Alicia Partnoy - human rights activist, poet, and translator
 César Pelli - architect
 Henry Pleasants (1833–1880) - Argentine-born, he was a coal mining engineer and an officer in the Union Army during the American Civil War. 
 Jorge M. Pérez - real estate developer
 Richard Revesz - dean of the New York University School of Law
 Nancy Sutley - Chair of the White House Council on Environmental Quality
 Susana Torre - Argentine-born American architect, critic and educator 
 Rodolfo Valentin - New York City hairdresser and entrepreneur 
 Alex Yemenidjian - CEO of Armenco Holdings and Regal Entertainment Group
 Hector Arzeno - businessman, banker and politician

References

Americans
Argentine American
Argentine Americans
Argentine